La'el Collins (born July 26, 1993; pronounced ) is an American football offensive tackle for the Cincinnati Bengals of the National Football League (NFL). He played college football at LSU, where he won the Jacobs Blocking Trophy, recognizing Southeastern Conference's (SEC) top offensive lineman, in 2014. Collins signed with the Dallas Cowboys as an undrafted free agent in 2015.

Early life
A native of Baton Rouge, Louisiana, Collins attended Redemptorist High School, where he was named to the Louisiana 3A All-State team in each of his final three seasons. Paving the way for running back Jeremy Hill, Collins helped lead Redemptorist to a LHSAA Class 3A state quarterfinals berth in his senior year, where the team lost to Patterson, which was led by running back Kenny Hilliard. After the season, Collins played in the Under Armour All-America Game and was also named All-American by Parade and USA Today.

Regarded as a five-star prospect by every major recruiting source, Collins was listed as one of the premier offensive tackle prospects in the class of 2011. Rivals.com ranked him second behind only Cyrus Kouandjio, while ESPN had him in third place, behind Kouandjio and Christian Westerman. Collins had offers from almost every major program in the country, including Auburn, Florida State, and Southern California, but committed early to Louisiana State in September 2009.

College career
In his true freshman year in 2011, Collins played in seven games with no starts. In a total of 46 snaps on the offensive line, he posted five knockdown blocks and was recognized as a Freshman All-American by CBSSports.com after the season. As a sophomore, Collins started all 13 games for LSU, replacing Will Blackwell at left guard, and led the team in both total snaps (836) and knockdowns (64.5). He was named SEC Offensive Lineman of the Week after playing all 84 offensive snaps at #1 Alabama, helping the Tigers to compile 22 first downs, 139 yards rushing, and 296 passing against the nation's No. 1 defense. Having played every offensive snap in LSU's last eleven games, Collins earned honorable mention All-SEC honors by the Associated Press.

In his junior season, Collins was moved to left tackle, filling the void left by Chris Faulk. Quickly adjusting to his new position, he earned SEC Offensive Lineman of the Week honors after playing all but one snap in a 37–27 over Texas Christian in the season-opener. Collins went on to start twelve games at left tackle, only missing the Furman game in October. Louisiana State's offense accounted for school-record 465.9 total yards per game, which included 200.8 rushing and 256.8 passing, and a school-record 37 rushing touchdowns.

Collins turned down an opportunity to enter the 2014 NFL Draft to return to LSU for his senior season. He started all 13 games at left tackle, leading the team in both offensive snaps (843) and knockdowns (88). The Tigers offense rushed for an average of 224.5 yards a game, the most by the team since averaging 256.6 in 1997. After the season, Collins was awarded the Jacobs Blocking Trophy, given annually to the top offensive lineman in the SEC as voted on by the league’s coaches, as the first LSU Tiger to win since Ciron Black in 2009. Collins was also voted First-team All-SEC by the league's coaches and the Associated Press. Both USA Today and AP named him second-team All-American.

Professional career

Regarded as a first round pick in the 2015 NFL Draft and a likely top ten prospect, Collins started to drop when it was announced that he was scheduled to talk to the Louisiana State police days after the draft, about the shooting death of a pregnant woman with whom he previously had a relationship, even though he was not considered a suspect in the crime. He eventually went undrafted after his agents threatened that he would sit out the season and enter the 2016 NFL Draft, if any NFL team selected him after the third round.

Dallas Cowboys
On May 7, 2015, Collins signed as an undrafted free agent with the Dallas Cowboys. His entire three-year contract was guaranteed and worth $1,599,000 with a $21,000 signing bonus. After opening the season as a reserve offensive guard, he saw extensive action in the second game as part of the rotation that replaced an injured Ronald Leary and was later declared the starter for the third game. He eventually passed Leary on the depth chart and was promoted as the starter at left guard during the week 6 bye. He was declared inactive with a high left ankle sprain for the last game against the Washington Redskins.

In 2016, he began the season as the starter at left guard over Leary, but suffered a torn ligament in his right big toe in the third game against the Chicago Bears and was placed on injured reserve on October 4.

Following the retirement of Doug Free, Collins moved over to right tackle and was named the starter to begin the season. On July 25, 2017, Collins signed a two-year, $15.4 million contract extension through the 2019 season. On September 3, 2019, Collins signed a five-year, $50 million contract extension with the Cowboys, keeping him on contract through the 2024 season. On September 7, 2020, Collins was placed on injured reserve. On September 10, 2021, Collins was suspended for five games for violating the league’s substance abuse policy, regarding a missed drug test. He returned to action in Week 6.

On March 17, 2022, the Cowboys released Collins with three years remaining on his contract.

Cincinnati Bengals
Collins signed a three-year contract with the Cincinnati Bengals on March 20, 2022. During a Week 16 matchup against the New England Patriots, he suffered a torn ACL and MCL, ultimately ending his season.

References

External links
Dallas Cowboys bio
LSU Tigers bio

1993 births
Living people
Players of American football from Baton Rouge, Louisiana
African-American players of American football
American football offensive tackles
LSU Tigers football players
Dallas Cowboys players
21st-century African-American sportspeople
Cincinnati Bengals players